Sidney Edward Mezes (September 23, 1863 – September 10, 1931) was an American philosopher.

Biography
He was born in what is now the town of Belmont, California on September 23, 1863, to a Spanish-born father and Italian-born mother. He graduated in 1884 from the University of California, Berkeley in engineering and was a member of the Chi Phi Fraternity. After returning to university, he graduated in 1890 from Harvard University, in philosophy, being awarded a doctorate there in 1893. From 1893 to 1894 he taught philosophy at the University of Chicago. From 1894 he was for, 20 years, in positions at the University of Texas, becoming a professor there in 1906. From 1908 he was president of the University.

In 1914 he became president of the College of the City of New York. In 1917 he was appointed as Director of the Inquiry, a think tank set up by Woodrow Wilson to study the diplomatic position that would follow a victorious end to World War I. He was part of the American Commission to Negotiate Peace at the Treaty of Versailles in 1919.

In 1896, he married Annie Olive Hunter, a sister-in-law of Edward M. House.

He died on September 10, 1931 in Pasadena, California.

Works
The Conception of God, A Philosophical Discussion Concerning the Nature of the Divine Idea as a Demonstrable Reality (1897) with Josiah Royce, Joseph Le Conte, George Holmes Howison
Ethics, Descriptive and Explanatory (1901)
What Really Happened at Paris, edited by Charles Seymour and Edward Mandell House (1921) contributor

See also
 American philosophy
 List of American philosophers

External links
Texas Online Handbook page
Obituary

1863 births
1931 deaths
American philosophers
Presidents of the University of Texas at Austin
Harvard University alumni
UC Berkeley College of Engineering alumni
Presidents of City College of New York
American people of Italian descent
People from Belmont, California